The 2022 Judo World Masters was held at the Pais Arena in Jerusalem, Israel, from 20 to 22 December 2022 as part of the IJF World Tour and during the 2024 Summer Olympics qualification period.

Schedule
The draw was held on 19 December at 14:00. All times are local (UTC+2).

Medal summary

Men's events

Source:

Women's events

Source:

Medal table

Prize money
The sums written are per medalist, bringing the total prizes awarded to €196,000.

References

External links
 

World Masters
IJF World Masters
World Masters
World Masters 2022
Judo
Judo World Masters
Judo
Judo World Masters